Pinnacle Ridge is located in the Wind River Range in the U.S. state of Wyoming. Pinnacle Ridge is an arête and the highest point on that ridge is the 14th highest summit in Wyoming, about equidistant from Gannett Peak to the north and Mount Woodrow Wilson to the south. The summit is on the Continental Divide in both Shoshone and Bridger-Teton National Forests. The Dinwoody Glacier is on the eastern slopes of Pinnacle Ridge.

References

Ridges of Wyoming
Landforms of Fremont County, Wyoming
Landforms of Sublette County, Wyoming